The city of Seremban, Negeri Sembilan, Malaysia is linked by rail from KTMB's Seremban station to Kuala Lumpur, Singapore and the coastal town of Port Dickson  (ceased operations in 2008), and has a commuter rail network. It lacks its own airport and is served by the nearby Kuala Lumpur International Airport. Local and longer-distance bus services use a bus station at Terminal 1 Bus Terminal and Shopping Centre, Negeri Sembilan's primary transportation hub. Major roads include Federal Route 1, Federal Route 51, Federal Route 86, Federal Route 366, North–South Expressway Southern Route (E2), Kajang-Seremban Highway (E21), Seremban-Port Dickson Highway (E29), and the Seremban Inner Ring Road (SIRR). The major streets in the city have been renamed since colonial days.

Intracity transport

Rail

Commuter rail

The rail connection was first constructed in the late 1890s as a stop on the Kuala Lumpur–Singapore main line, and until today, the Seremban railway station still serves as one of the major stops along the line. This station also serves as the southern terminal of the Keretapi Tanah Melayu electrified commuter network, KTM Komuter, which links the town to Kuala Lumpur and the Klang Valley on Seremban Line. Seremban station also serves as the terminal for the Seremban–Port Dickson railway line, one of Malaysia's oldest railway lines, built during the colonial era. However, today, this route is less frequently used.

Road

Trunk road
The Malaysia Federal Route 1, the oldest major roadway that connects the major towns and cities of the West Coast of Peninsular Malaysia runs through Seremban. It connects Seremban with neighbouring towns such as Rembau and Tampin to the south and Kajang, Selangor to the north. Seremban also provides access to the towns of Kuala Klawang and Kuala Pilah to the east and the well-known coastal town of Port Dickson to the west.

Highway
 North–South Expressway: The North–South Expressway (Malaysia) runs through the town. Seremban is well-connected by road to other nearby Malaysian cities such as Malacca and Johor Bahru to the south and Kuala Lumpur to the north. Drivers can exit to Seremban town via 3 interchanges: (from north to south) Seremban, Port Dickson and Senawang. As of year 2005 until 2007, PLUS will be expanding the 2-lane Seremban section highway to 3 lanes in order to ease traffic during peak hours and festive seasons.

 Seremban–Port Dickson Highway: The Seremban–Port Dickson Highway, which ends in Seremban, provides a faster but a tolled alternative route to Port Dickson. The highway connects Port Dickson, Lukut and Bandar Springhill to Seremban.

The Public Works Department has also begun the construction of the  Seremban Inner Ring Road which will help alleviate traffic flow in and out of the town centre, which is frequently congested during the peak hours. One of the phases of the project includes widening and building a viaduct on Jalan Rasah (completed) and Sikamat to Senawang, the main road connecting residential areas along the Seremban–Port Dickson route with the city centre.

Inner city road

Like Ipoh and Taiping, Seremban town's street composes primarily of grid based layouts that begins and ends on the outer fringes of the town area. Additionally, a series of additional roads were formed throughout much of the town's Lake Gardens, curving around the park. Many of the town's streets were originally referred to in English with a handful of Malay street names included in the mix. Several streets were named after local landmarks, but others were predominantly named after prominent Federated Malay States officials, especially those who served in Negeri Sembilan. Following the passing of the National Language Act in 1967, the street names were first translated in Malay, while many were further renamed later, removing traces of colonial connotations. Many of the renamed streets are currently named in honour of local figures.

Bus Service

Bus service in Seremban is rather poor compared to other cities around the country before the bus network revamp, resulting in heavy congestion in Seremban. The main bus terminal in Seremban is situated at Terminal One Shopping Centre. It is located on Jalan Lintang, which provides bus services to residents from outlying towns in Negeri Sembilan, such as Port Dickson, Bahau, Jelebu and Tampin. There are frequent express bus services by companies such as Sistem Kenderaan Seremban and Suasana Edaran from Seremban to Kuala Lumpur and Malacca. The city council also offers free shuttle bus service, however due to the bus service not being received well by locals, the city council was decided to stop the service,  while being brought back by Pakatan Harapan government. The myBAS service provide a quality and punctual local bus services in Seremban.

Major bus companies operating in Seremban include:
Sistem Kenderaan Seremban
Suasana Edaran
Plusliner
Cepat Express
Mara Liner
Statecoach
Cityliner

Port infrastructure

Airport
Negeri Sembilan is one of the two states in Malaysia that are not accessible via air transportation (Perlis being the other state). However the Kuala Lumpur International Airport (KLIA) is less than a 30 minutes drive from Seremban, essentially making the airport closer to Seremban rather than Kuala Lumpur.

See also
 Transportation in Malaysia
 Rail transport in Malaysia
 KTM Intercity
 Road Transport Department Malaysia

References

Seremban